Georgia participated in the Eurovision Song Contest 2019 with the song "Keep On Going" written by Roman Giorgadze and Diana Giorgadze. The song was performed by Oto Nemsadze. The Georgian broadcaster Georgian Public Broadcaster (GPB) held the reality television show Georgian Idol in order to select the Georgian entry for the 2019 contest in Tel Aviv, Israel. The competition resulted in the selection of four finalists that performed potential Eurovision songs during the final on 3 March 2019. The results of a public vote exclusively resulted in the selection of "Sul tsin iare" performed by Oto Nemsadze as the Georgian entry, having received 44.13% of the votes. The song was later retitled for the Eurovision Song Contest and was titled "Keep On Going".

Georgia was drawn to compete in the first semi-final of the Eurovision Song Contest which took place on 14 May 2019. Performing during the show in position 11, "Keep On Going" was not announced among the top 10 entries of the first semi-final and therefore did not qualify to compete in the final. It was later revealed that Georgia placed fourteenth out of the 17 participating countries in the semi-final with 62 points.

Background

Prior to the 2019 contest, Georgia had participated in the Eurovision Song Contest eleven times since their first entry in 2007. The nation's highest placing in the contest, to this point, has been ninth place, which was achieved on two occasions: in 2010 with the song "Shine" performed by Sofia Nizharadze and in 2011 with the song "One More Day" performed by Eldrine. The nation briefly withdrew from the contest in 2009 after the European Broadcasting Union (EBU) rejected the Georgian entry, "We Don't Wanna Put In", for perceived political references to Vladimir Putin who was the Russian Prime Minister at the time. The withdrawal and fallout was tied to tense relations between Georgia and then host country Russia, which stemmed from the 2008 Russo-Georgian War. Following the introduction of semi-finals, Georgia has, to this point, failed to qualify to the final on four occasions. In , Georgia failed to qualify to the final with the song "For You" performed by the Ethno-Jazz Band Iriao.

The Georgian national broadcaster, Georgian Public Broadcaster (GPB), broadcasts the event within Georgia and organises the selection process for the nation's entry. GPB confirmed their intentions to participate at the 2019 Eurovision Song Contest on 17 September 2018. Georgia has selected their entry for the Eurovision Song Contest both through national finals and internal selections in the past. In 2018, GPB opted to internally select the Georgian entry. For their 2019 participation, the Georgian entry was selected via the reality television show Georgian Idol.

Before Eurovision

Georgian Idol
The Georgian entry for the Eurovision Song Contest 2019 was selected through the eighth season of Georgian Idol, the Georgian version of the reality television singing competition format Idols created by Simon Fuller. The competition premiered on 5 January 2019 and concluded with a final on 3 March 2019. All shows in the competition were hosted by Vaniko Tarkhnishvili and Ruska Makashvili with the live shows taking place at the Tbilisi Concert Hall in Tbilisi, broadcast on the GPB First Channel as well as online at the broadcaster's website 1tv.ge.

Judges 
A four-member judging panel determined the contestants that would advance to the live shows and commented on the contestants' performances during the live shows. The judging panel consisted of:

 Tinatin Berdzenishvili – Director of Media and Communications at GPB
 Stephane Mgebrishvili – Musician
 Natia Todua – Singer
 Zaza Shengelia – President of Bravo Records

Competing entries 
GPB opened two separate submissions: one for singers (from 27 October 2018 until 1 December 2018) and one for songs (from 21 December 2018 until 1 February 2019). Applicants attended preliminary auditions held in the following eleven cities across Georgia:

 27 October 2018 – 1 December 2018: Tbilisi
 30 October 2018: Telavi and Gurjaani
 31 October 2018: Akhmeta and Lagodekhi
 1 November 2018: Gori
 2 November 2018: Borjomi and Akhaltsikhe
 6 November 2018: Chiatura
 13–14 November 2018: Batumi
 15 November 2018: Kutaisi

38 contestants progressed to the audition shows in front of the judging panel, while over 200 songs were received by the song submission deadline. A seven-member expert commission selected the top three songs from the received submissions, which were announced on 26 February 2019. The expert commission consisted of Davit Evgenidze, 2013 Georgian Eurovision entrant Nodiko Tatishvili, Zura Ramishvili, Giorgi Asanishvili, Manana Morchiladze, Lana Kutateladze and Khatuna Koberidze.

Contestant progress in the live shows 
Colour key

Shows

Audition shows 
The judging panel shortlisted 48 contestants following the audition shows aired between 5 January 2019 and 19 January 2019, and selected the top ten that would progress to the live shows from a further 22 shortlisted contestants. Among the contestants were 2010 Georgian Junior Eurovision entrant Mariam Kakhelishvili and member of 2011 Georgian Junior Eurovision winners Candy, Iru Khechanovi.

Live shows 
Two of the ten contestants were eliminated in the first live show on 26 January 2019, while one was eliminated during each of the second to fifth live shows between 2 February 2019 and 23 February 2019. The results of the live shows were determined exclusively by a public vote through televoting and voting via Facebook messenger.

Final 
Each of the four remaining contestants presented one of the three candidate Eurovision songs during the final live show on 3 March 2019. The winner, "Sul tsin iare" performed by Oto Nemsadze, was determined exclusively by a public vote through televoting and voting via Facebook messenger.

Promotion
Prior to the contest, Oto Nemsadze specifically promoted "Keep On Going" as the Georgian Eurovision entry on 6 April 2019 by performing during the Eurovision in Concert event which was held at the AFAS Live venue in Amsterdam, Netherlands and hosted by Cornald Maas and Marlayne.

In April 2019, the official music video of "Keep On Going" was released. The video, directed by Giorgi Ebralidze, was filmed at a number of locations in Georgia including Maltakva village, Enguri Bridge, and Tbilisi, and also featured singers of the ensemble Shavnabada.

At Eurovision 
According to Eurovision rules, all nations with the exceptions of the host country and the "Big Five" (France, Germany, Italy, Spain and the United Kingdom) are required to qualify from one of two semi-finals in order to compete for the final; the top ten countries from each semi-final progress to the final. The European Broadcasting Union (EBU) split up the competing countries into six different pots based on voting patterns from previous contests, with countries with favourable voting histories put into the same pot. On 28 January 2019, a special allocation draw was held which placed each country into one of the two semi-finals, as well as which half of the show they would perform in. Georgia was placed into the first semi-final, to be held on 14 May 2019, and was scheduled to perform in the second half of the show.

Once all the competing songs for the 2019 contest had been released, the running order for the semi-finals was decided by the shows' producers rather than through another draw, so that similar songs were not placed next to each other. Georgia was set to perform in position 11, following the entry from Belgium and before the entry from Australia.

The two semi-finals and the final were broadcast in Georgia on GPB First Channel with commentary by Junior Eurovision Song Contest 2017 co-host, Helen Kalandadze, and member of 2018 Georgian Eurovision entrant Ethno-Jazz Band Iriao, Gaga Abashidze. 2013 Georgian Eurovision entrant Nodiko Tatishvili also took part in the commentary for the final. The Georgian spokesperson, who announced the top 12-point score awarded by the Georgian jury during the final, was Gaga Abashidze.

Semi-final

Oto Nemsadze took part in technical rehearsals on 5 and 9 May, followed by dress rehearsals on 13 and 14 May. This included the jury show on 13 May where the professional juries of each country watched and voted on the competing entries.

The Georgian performance featured Oto Nemsadze in a black costume designed by Georgian designer Giorgi Shaghashvili, joined on stage by five backing vocalists which first appeared as silhouettes. The LED screens transitioned from a snowy mountain background with starry skies and barbed wires to images of fire, during which the stage colours were red. The performance also featured smoke and pyrotechnic flame effects. The five backing performers that joined Oto Nemsadze were: Dato Tsintsadze, Giga Chigogidze, Giorgi Kananadze, Mikheil Javakhishvili and Spartak Sharikadze. Mikheil Javakhishvili previously represented Georgia in 2018 as part of the Ethno-Jazz Band Iriao.

At the end of the show, Georgia was not announced among the top 10 entries in the first semi-final and therefore failed to qualify to compete in the final. It was later revealed that Georgia placed fourteenth in the semi-final, receiving a total of 62 points: 33 points from the televoting and 29 points from the juries.

Voting
Voting during the three shows involved each country awarding two sets of points from 1-8, 10 and 12: one from their professional jury and the other from televoting. Each nation's jury consisted of five music industry professionals who are citizens of the country they represent, with their names published before the contest to ensure transparency. This jury judged each entry based on: vocal capacity; the stage performance; the song's composition and originality; and the overall impression by the act. In addition, no member of a national jury was permitted to be related in any way to any of the competing acts in such a way that they cannot vote impartially and independently. The individual rankings of each jury member as well as the nation's televoting results were released shortly after the grand final.

Below is a breakdown of points awarded to Georgia and awarded by Georgia in the first semi-final and grand final of the contest, and the breakdown of the jury voting and televoting conducted during the two shows:

Points awarded to Georgia

Points awarded by Georgia

Detailed voting results
The following members comprised the Georgian jury:
 Khatuna Koberidze (jury chairperson)radio musical program producer
 Mariko Lezhavasinger, vocal coach
 Boris Shkhianimusical producer
 Levan Abshilava (Jojo)singer, represented Georgia in the 2018 contest as part of Iriao
 Lado

References 

2019
Countries in the Eurovision Song Contest 2019
Eurovision